Wunna (stylized in all caps) is the second studio album by American rapper Gunna. It was released on May 22, 2020, by YSL Records and 300 Entertainment. The album features guest appearances from Young Thug, Nechie, Lil Baby, Roddy Ricch, and Travis Scott. The deluxe edition was released on July 24, 2020. It features additional guest appearances from Yak Gotti, Future, Nav, and Lil Uzi Vert.

Wunna received generally favorable reviews from critics and debuted atop the US Billboard 200, earning 111,000 album-equivalent units of which 4,000 were pure sales, becoming Gunna's first number-one album. It was supported by three singles: "Skybox", "Wunna", and "Dollaz on My Head".

Background
In September 2019, Gunna first announced that he would be dropping new music "very, very soon". Throughout January and February 2020, the rapper kept hinting at the release of new music which was eventually followed up by the single release "Skybox". On March 17, 2020, he explained on his Twitter that the album title stands for "Wealthy Unapologetic Nigga Naturally Authentic". In April 2020, the rapper revealed that the album was supposed to be out already by that date but the COVID-19 pandemic interfered with his plans. He announced the release date on April 30. On May 18, a video for the title track "Wunna" was released. The video was shot in Jamaica and serves as the first part of an upcoming album documentary. Gunna previously teased the song in March 2020.

Singles
The album's first single, "Skybox", was released on March 6, 2020, as well an accompanying music video. The song peaked at number 65 on the US Billboard Hot 100.

The album's second single, "Wunna", was released on May 18, 2020, while the music video was released the next day. The song peaked at number 57 on the Billboard Hot 100.

The album's third single, "Dollaz on My Head" featuring Young Thug, was sent to rhythmic contemporary radio on July 6, 2020. The song peaked at number 38 on the Billboard Hot 100.

Critical reception

Wunna was met with generally favorable reviews. At Metacritic, which assigns a normalized rating out of 100 to reviews from professional publications, the album received an average score of 67, based on six reviews.

Pitchforks reviewer Alphonse Pierre gave the album a positive review, stating that "Gunna has the heart and is the most engaged he's sounded since his 2018 breakthrough, Drip Season 3". While calling the album monotonous at times, Pierre commended Gunna's performances, saying that "it's hard to not have fun when Gunna is telling posh tales in a rushed melody over Wheezy and Turbo beats that sound like an elevator ride up to a penthouse". Reviewing the album for HipHopDX, Mimi Kenny stated "Gunna received invaluable support on his way to fame, but with Wunna, it looks like he may be able to take it from here". Danny Schwartz of Rolling Stone praised the album, stating, "While some of his writing is of the Fisher-Price variety—one verse in "Met Gala" employs a AAAAAAAAAAAAAAA rhyme scheme—and his lyrics aren't always well thought out ("Say the wrong word, and I'mma shoot him in his shit"), Wunna remains a transportive listening experience, due in large part to its production, which exists in almost perfect harmony with Gunna's soothing vocals". Charles Lyons-Burt of Slant Magazine said, "The album represents an evolution from trap easy-listening to big-canvas rap artistry".

In a mixed review, AllMusic critic David Crone wrote the following: "While WUNNA deserves points for its cohesiveness and impressive highs, its padding proves its downfall: the album's closing run means it remains a pick-and-mix affair, rather than a definitive statement." In a negative review, Beats Per Minutes Chase McMullen stated: "Should you desire to be kind, you can call the album mood music. In theory, it's an astrology themed LP, with Wunna representing an alter-ego, but none of that comes across. ... Even his voice lacks any distinction, a hushed, fatigued monotone that could belong to anyone, with so little presence that it hardly registers over the beats."

Year-end lists

Commercial performance
Wunna debuted at number one on the US Billboard 200 chart, earning 111,000 album-equivalent units, (of which 4,000 were in pure album sales) in its first week. This became Gunna's US number one debut. The album also accumulated a total of 143.6 million on-demand streams of the set's tracks in the week ending May 28. In its second week, the album dropped to number four on the chart, earning an additional 49,000 units.

Track listing

Notes
 All tracks are stylized in all caps, for example, "Skybox" is stylized as "SKYBOX".

Personnel
Credits adapted from album's liner notes and Tidal.

 Flo Ongonga – engineering , mixing 
 Turbo – engineering 
 A. Bainz – engineering , mixing 
 Alejandro "Aleo" Neira – engineering , engineering assistant 
 Shaan Singh – engineering 
 AJ – engineering 
 MarQuell Randolph – engineering 
 Bryan Anzel – engineering 
 Armani Mitchell – engineering assistant 
 E Town 100 – engineering assistant 
 Patrizio Pigliapoco – mixing 
 Alex Tumay – mixing 
 Mixed By Ali – mixing for Roddy Ricch 
 Mike Dean – mixing for Travis Scott 
 Ashley Jackson – mixing assistant 
 Harry Taylor – mixing assistant 
 Aresh Banaji – mixing assistant 
 Nathan Miller – uncredited mixing assistant 
 Christal Jerez – uncredited mixing assistant 
 Joe LaPorta – mastering

Charts

Weekly charts

Year-end charts

Certifications

Release history

References

2020 albums
Gunna (rapper) albums
YSL Records albums
Albums produced by Mike Will Made It
Albums produced by Pi'erre Bourne
Albums produced by Tay Keith
Albums produced by Wheezy